The Scout and Guide movement in Chad is served by two organisations
 Association de Guides du Tchad, member of the World Association of Girl Guides and Girl Scouts
 Fédération du Scoutisme Tchadien, member of the World Organization of the Scout

See also